Timothy "Tim" Twardzik is an American businessman and politician. He is a Republican member of the Pennsylvania House of Representatives, representing the 123rd district in Schuylkill County since 2021. Twardzik is noted as the first Republican to represent the 123rd Legislative District in over 50 years. Prior to public service, he served as an Executive for Ateeco Inc.

Biography
Twardzik graduated from Shenandoah Valley High School in 1977 and from the University of Notre Dame in 1981.

In 2020, Twardzik was elected to the Pennsylvania House of Representatives representing the 123rd district, which is part of Schuylkill County. He defeated Democratic candidate Peter Symons with 62.6% of the vote in the general election.

Prior to his election to the Pennsylvania House of Representatives, Tim was the retired executive vice president and co-owner of Ateeco Inc. in Shenandoah, the marketer of Mrs. T’s, the world’s largest selling brand of frozen pierogies.

Twardzik currently sits on the Commerce, Education, Health, and Urban Affairs committees.

In 2022, Twardzik was opposed by Kathy Benyak. Twardzik won in a landslide, taking nearly 70% of the vote.

References

External links
Pennsylvania House of Representatives profile
Campaign website

Living people
Republican Party members of the Pennsylvania House of Representatives
21st-century American politicians
Year of birth missing (living people)